Featherstone Field, previously known as Murdock Stadium is a stadium on the campus of El Camino College in Torrance, California.

Built in 1958 the stadium seats around 12,127 on wood-backed bleacher seats. It was home to the North American Soccer League's Los Angeles Aztecs for two years (1975–1976), the American Soccer League's Southern California Lazers for a single season in 1978, as well as several United States men's national soccer team FIFA World Cup qualification matches.  Today, it hosts El Camino College's American football team.  The stadium was originally named after the founding president of the college, Forrest G. Murdock.

The stadium was also used as the main stadium in the 2005 remake of the 1974 film, The Longest Yard. The 2005 film starred Adam Sandler, Chris Rock, James Cromwell and Burt Reynolds, who actually played the lead role in the original film.

The original stadium was demolished and a new state of the art stadium was opened in September 2016. In 2019, El Camino College announced that they would rename the field inside Murdock Stadium after longtime football coach John Featherstone, a former coach at El Camino. The stadium is also the annual host site of California Interscholastic Federation (CIF) Los Angeles City Section high school football championship games.

International games

References

External links
LA Sports - Murdock Stadium 

m
Sports venues completed in 1958
Sports venues in Greater Los Angeles
American football venues in California
Athletics (track and field) venues in California
College football venues
North American Soccer League (1968–1984) stadiums
Soccer venues in California
El Camino Warriors
Torrance, California
Buildings and structures in Torrance, California
1958 establishments in California